St. John's South is a defunct provincial electoral district for the House of Assembly of Newfoundland and Labrador, Canada. As of its final contest in 2011, there were 7,923 eligible voters living within the district.

Historically working class in nature, St. John's South includes increasingly prosperous residential pockets. The district covers the traditional "west end" of St. John's (now geographically closer to the centre, due to city expansion), the western section of the downtown core and the south side of the harbour to Cape Spear, including the neighbourhood of Shea Heights. In the 2007 redistribution, four per cent of Kilbride was added. The district was abolished in 2015 and largely replaced by Waterford Valley.

Members of the House of Assembly
The district has elected the following Members of the House of Assembly:

Election results

|-

|-
 
|NDP
|Keith Dunne
|align="right"|1,994
|align="right"|38.92%
|align="right"|
|-

|}

|-

|-
 
|NDP
|Clyde Bridger
|align="right"|571
|align="right"|11.69%
|align="right"|
|-

|}

|-

|-

|-
 
|NDP
|Tom McGinnis 
|align="right"|676
|align="right"|
|align="right"|
|} 
Dennis O'Keefe who ran as the Liberal candidate is not the same Dennis O'Keefe that served as Mayor of St. John's.

 
|NDP
|Judy Vanata
|align="right"|374
|align="right"|6.14%
|align="right"|

|Independent
|Jason Crummey
|align="right"|101
|align="right"|1.66%
|align="right"|
|-
|}

 
|NDP
|Sue Skipton
|align="right"|858
|align="right"|14.35%
|align="right"|

|Independent
|Bill Maddigan
|align="right"|155
|align="right"|2.59%
|align="right"|
|-
|}

 
|NDP
|Bert Pitcher
|align="right"|576
|align="right"|11.36%
|align="right"|
|-
|}

 
|NDP
|Linda Hyde
|align="right"|679
|align="right"|
|align="right"|
|-
|}

 
|NDP
|Bob Matthews
|align="right"|924
|align="right"|
|align="right"|
|-
|}

 
|NDP
|Barbara Roberts
|align="right"|235
|align="right"|
|align="right"|
|-
|}

References

External links 
Website of the Newfoundland and Labrador House of Assembly

Newfoundland and Labrador provincial electoral districts
Politics of St. John's, Newfoundland and Labrador